Chemmozhi express (Train Nos 16615/16616) is an superfast express daily train run by Indian Railways between Coimbatore city Junction and Mannargudi. The train was named after Chemmozhi Manadu that took place in Coimbatore in 2010. This train passes through Tirupur, Erode, Karur, Tiruchirappalli, Thanjavur and Needamangalam with a total of 6 intermediate stations. Similarly for return direction, the train (numbered 16615) starts from Mannargudi at 20:20 and reaches Coimbatore City at 05:00 on the next day from the start of journey.

Coach Composition

 1 AC I Tier + II Tier (Hybrid) 
 1 AC III Tier
 8 Sleeper Coaches
 6 General
 2 Second-class Luggage/parcel van

References

Transport in Coimbatore
Transport in Mannargudi
Railway services introduced in 2013
Named passenger trains of India
Rail transport in Tamil Nadu
Express trains in India